Erika Patricia de la Vega Quesada (born March 13, 1975) is a Venezuelan television host, comedian, actress and announcer. She has a son named Matías Ignacio who was born as a result of her relationship with the musician, producer and businessman José Luis Pardo (Cheo Pardo/DJ Afro), with whom she has been married since 2012.

Filmography

Television
 Ya era hora (Telemundo) 2016
 Suelta la sopa (2014–present)
 Yo Soy el Artista
 El show de Erika: Casi Late Night (Telemundo) 2014
 Gala Interactiva Miss Venezuela 2013 (Venevisión)
 Pepsi Venezuela Music Awards 2013 (Televen)
 Gala Interactiva Miss Venezuela 2012 (Venevisión)
 Erika Tipo 11 (Venevisión Plus)
 Latin American Idol (Sony Entertainment Television)
 Fama, Sudor y Lágrimas (RCTV)
 Diente por diente (RCTV)
 Ni tan tarde (Televen) (Puma TV)

Films
 2010 – Toy Story 3 – Dolly
 2011 – Er Conde Jones

Theatre 
Erika de la Vega starred in a Spanish adaptation of Duncan Macmillan's Every Brilliant Thing at the Colony Theatre in 2018. The one woman show follows De la Vega's character through her life - from adolescence to adulthood - and her attempts to deal with her mother's deep depression.

The play ran at the Colony Theatre from June 22 - July 22, 2018, and had a second run from December 8–30, 2018.

References 

Living people
1975 births
Venezuelan television presenters
Venezuelan television talk show hosts
Venezuelan film actresses
Venezuelan television personalities
Actresses from Caracas
Venezuelan women comedians
Venezuelan women television presenters